Arotrophora diadela is a species of moth of the family Tortricidae. It is found in Australia, where it has been recorded from Western Australia.

The wingspan is about 22.5 mm.

References

Moths described in 1963
Arotrophora
Moths of Australia